A referendum on the constitution of the Batavian Republic was held on August 8, 1797. The draft constitution was rejected, eventually culminating in a coup d'état.

Background
The country we now know as the Netherlands had declared independence as the Republic of the Seven United Provinces in 1581. This independence was officially recognized in the Peace of Westphalia of 1648. As the name indicates, the country was a federation of seven autonomous provinces: the duchy of Gelre, the counties of Holland and Zeeland, the former bishopric of Utrecht, the lordship of Overijssel and the free provinces of Friesland and Groningen. Each province was governed by the Provincial States; the main executive official was a stadtholder (stadhouder in Dutch). Over the years, these stadtholderships were concentrated among the descendants of William the Silent.

This led to a friction with the regenten, the wealthy merchant class, who were mainly based in Amsterdam. They saw the central position of the House of Orange-Nassau in Dutch politics as a threat to their own power. The infighting between the regents and the Orangists was one of the causes of the downturn of the Netherlands as a global economic and military power throughout the 18th century.

In the 1780s, the tensions came to a head in the Batavian Revolution, a struggle between republican Patriots and royalist Orangists. The Patriots, aided by French troops, eventually managed to drive stadtholder William V out of the country in late 1794. A few weeks later, on January 19, 1795, the Batavian Republic was proclaimed.

The Nationale Vergadering (National Assembly) subsequently went through two years of discussions. On May 10, 1797, a final draft constitution was formed. The constitution was a compromise between two groups: those who felt that the gewesten (regions) in the Republic should maintain their historic autonomy, and those who felt that the Republic should become a unitary state.

Results

Aftermath
The draft constitution had been rejected by almost eighty percent, which meant that a new Constitution would have to be drafted. In the elections for the National Assembly a few months later, the supporters of a unitary state won the majority, but the supporters of a federal state retained the majority in the constitutional commission. Meanwhile, in France, the radicals led by Pierre Augereau had seized power. With French help, the radical unitarists staged a coup d'état in January 1798. A new constitution, establishing a unitary republic, was quickly adopted in the National Assembly. This draft constitution was approved in a referendum on April 23, 1798.

References

1797
1797 referendums
Constitutional referendum
Constitutional referendums